The women's javelin throw at the 1954 European Athletics Championships was held in Bern, Switzerland, at Stadion Neufeld on 25 August 1954.

Medalists

Results

Final
25 August

Participation
According to an unofficial count, 14 athletes from 10 countries participated in the event.

 (1)
 (1)
 (1)
 (1)
 (1)
 (1)
 (3)
 (1)
 (3)
 (1)

References

Javelin throw
Javelin throw at the European Athletics Championships
Euro